Ninth Fort memorial is a memorial designed by the Lithuanian sculptor Alfonsas Vincentas Ambraziūnas and unveiled in 1984. It commemorates the victims of the Ninth Fort, a Nazi execution site for the Jews in the Kovno Ghetto.

The mass burial place of the victims of the massacres carried out in the fort is a grass field, marked by a simple yet frankly worded memorial written in several languages. It reads, "This is the place where Nazis and their assistants killed about 45,000 Jews from Lithuania and other European countries."

On April 11, 2011, the memorial to the victims of Nazism was vandalized — the memorial tombstones were knocked down, and white swastikas were spray-painted on the memorial. On the adjacent sidewalk, the words “Juden raus” (German: Jews Out) were inscribed.

References

External links
 Photo essay about the monument and its construction

Monuments and memorials in Lithuania
Buildings and structures in Kaunas
Holocaust memorials
1984 establishments in Lithuania
Cultural infrastructure completed in 1984